Mike Garland (born May 31, 1954) is an American former head college basketball coach at Cleveland State University. Before being named head coach at Cleveland State he was an assistant at Michigan State under current head coach Tom Izzo. Before coaching Garland was a teammate of Tom Izzo's on the basketball team at Northern Michigan University. He was named Cleveland State head coach on April 17, 2003. He was relieved of his coaching duties on March 31, 2006. Garland spent one year as an assistant coach at SMU under head coach Matt Doherty, before rejoining the Michigan State basketball staff in 2007 as an assistant coach, and later the special assistant to the head coach in 2021. Garland announced his retirement from Michigan State on June 9, 2022.

Head coaching record

References

External links
 Michigan State profile
 Cleveland State profile

1954 births
Living people
American men's basketball coaches
Cleveland State Vikings men's basketball coaches
High school basketball coaches in the United States
Michigan State Spartans men's basketball coaches
Northern Michigan Wildcats men's basketball players
SMU Mustangs men's basketball coaches
American men's basketball players